Nadagara is a genus of moths in the family Geometridae first described by Francis Walker in 1861.

Description
Palpi with second joint hairy and reaching beyond the frontal tuft. Third joint porrect (extending forward). Antennae of male simple. Hind tibia not dilated. Forewings produced and acute at apex. Vein 3 from angle of cell and veins 7 to 9 stalked from before the angle. Vein 10 given off from vein 11. Hindwings with vein 3 from angle of cell. Cilia of both wings slightly crenulate (scalloped).

Species
Some species of this genus are:

Nadagara comprensata Walker, 1862
Nadagara inordinata Walker, 1862
Nadagara intractata Walker, 1862
Nadagara irretracta Warren, 1899
Nadagara juventinaria (Guenée, 1857)
Nadagara prosigna Prout, 1930
Nadagara reprensata Prout, 1916
Nadagara scitilineata Walker, 1862
Nadagara subnubila Inoue, 1967
Nadagara synocha Prout, 1923
Nadagara umbrifera Wileman, 1910
Nadagara vigaia Walker, 1862
Nadagara xylotrema (Lower, 1903)

References

Inoue, 1967. Genus Nadagara from Japan and Taiwan (Lepidoptera: Geometridae). Pacific Insects 9 (1): 105-110

Geometridae